Richmond Township is a civil township of Macomb County, Michigan, United States.  At the 2020 census, the township population was 3,544. The 2008 Census Bureau Estimate places the population at 3,784. A portion of the City of Richmond is adjacent to the township, but is administratively autonomous.

Geography
According to the United States Census Bureau, the township has a total area of 37.3 square miles (96.5 km), all land.

Demographics
At the 2000 census, there were 3,416 people, 1,020 households and 869 families residing in the township. The racial makeup of the township was 96.93% White, 0.97% African American, 0.38% Native American, 0.18% Asian, 0.18% from other races, and 1.38% from two or more races. Hispanic or Latino of any race were 1.08% of the population.

There were 1,020 households, of which 42.4% had children under the age of 18 living with them, 76.6% were married couples living together, 5.6% had a female householder with no husband present, and 14.8% were non-families. 11.6% of all households were made up of individuals, and 3.7% had someone living alone who was 65 years of age or older. The average household size was 3.14 and the average family size was 3.39.

Age distribution was 28.0% under the age of 18, 7.7% from 18 to 24, 28.7% from 25 to 44, 24.3% from 45 to 64, and 11.2% who were 65 years of age or older. The median age was 37 years. For every 100 females, there were 102.5 males. For every 100 females age 18 and over, there were 99.4 males.

The median household income was $69,449, and the median family income was $72,500. Males had a median income of $54,205 versus $28,427 for females. The per capita income for the township was $24,937. About 3.3% of families and 5.9% of the population were below the poverty line, including 7.3% of those under age 18 and 14.3% of those age 65 or over.

References

External links
NEMC-TV6: Romeo Township Area public-access television cable TV website

Townships in Macomb County, Michigan
Townships in Michigan